The 2019 Greek Cup Final was the 75th final of the Greek Football Cup. It took place on 11 May 2019 at Olympic Stadium, between PAOK and AEK Athens for a third time in row. It was PAOK's twentieth Greek Cup Final and third consecutive, in their 93 years of existence and AEK Athens' twenty fourth Greek Cup Final and fourth consecutive, of their 95-year history. For security issues, the match occurred behind closed doors with 1,500 invitations been distributed by both clubs and the HFF.

Venue

This was the twenty fourth Greek Cup Final held at the Athens Olympic Stadium, after the 1983, 1984, 1985, 1986, 1987, 1988, 1989, 1990, 1993, 1994, 1995, 1996, 1999, 2000, 2002, 2009, 2010, 2011, 2012, 2013, 2014, 2015, 2016 and 2018 finals.

The Athens Olympic Stadium was built in 1982 and renovated once in 2004. The stadium is used as a venue for AEK Athens, Panathinaikos and Greece and was used for Olympiacos in various occasions. Its current capacity is 69,618 and hosted 3 UEFA European Cup/Champions League Finals in 1983, 1994 and 2007, a UEFA Cup Winners' Cup Final in 1987, the 1991 Mediterranean Games and the 2004 Summer Olympics.

Background
PAOK had reached the Greek Cup Final nineteen times, winning six of them. The last time that had played in a Final was in 2018, where they had won AEK Athens by 2–0.

AEK Athens had reached the Greek Cup Final twenty three times, winning fourteen of them. The last time that they had won the Cup was in 2016 (2–1 against Olympiacos). The last time that had played in a Final was in 2018, where they had lost to PAOK by 2–0.

Route to the final

Match

Details

References

2019
Cup Final
Greek Cup Final 2019
Greek Cup Final 2019
Sports competitions in Athens
May 2019 sports events in Europe